The Girl from Chicago is a lost 1927 American silent criminal romantic drama film directed by Ray Enright and starring Myrna Loy and Conrad Nagel. It was produced and distributed by the Warner Bros. and is based upon a short story by Arthur Somers Roche that appeared in the June 1923 Redbook. The film later had a Vitaphone soundtrack of sound effects and music added.

The film is one of the earliest starring roles for Loy who at this time, 1927, did not usually star but was a supporting player. Warner Bros. took a chance casting her in a principal part.

Plot
Southern girl Mary Carlton finds out that her brother, Bob Carlton, is going to the electric chair for a crime he says he did not commit. In order to get her brother exonerated, Mary travels to New York and pretends to be a Chicago gun moll. She wins the love of two gangsters, Handsome Joe and Big Steve Drummond. Joe, it turns out, is not a gangster at all, but an undercover detective. He attempts to help Mary prove her brother's innocence, and the two of them are caught in a fierce gun battle between the crooks and the cops. They make it through alive (although Drummond gets his due), and Bob is released at the last minute.

Cast
Conrad Nagel as Handsome Joe
Myrna Loy as Mary Carlton
William Russell as Big Steve Drummond
Carroll Nye as Bob Carlton
Paul Panzer as Dopey
Erville Alderson as Colonel Carlton

References

External links

Lobby card
Still from gettyimages.com

1927 crime drama films
1927 romantic drama films
1927 films
American black-and-white films
American crime drama films
American romantic drama films
American silent feature films
Films directed by Ray Enright
Lost American films
Lost romantic drama films
Transitional sound films
Warner Bros. films
1927 lost films
1920s American films
Silent romantic drama films
Silent American drama films